Streblus smithii (also known as Smith's milkwood and the Three Kings milk tree) is a species of plant in the family Moraceae. It is endemic to Three Kings Islands, New Zealand. The bark exudes a thick white (often referred to as a milk-like) sap when cut. The flowers are small and unisexual and the fruit is either achene or drupe.

Gallery

References

smithii
Flora of New Zealand